The modern constellation Pisces lies across two of the quadrants symbolized by the Black Tortoise of the North (北方玄武, Běi Fāng Xuán Wǔ) and White Tiger of the West (西方白虎, Xī Fāng Bái Hǔ), and Three Enclosures (三垣, Sān Yuán), that divide the sky in traditional Chinese uranography.

The name of the western constellation in modern Chinese is 雙魚座 (shuāng yú zuò), which means "the pair of fish constellation".

Stars
The map of Chinese constellation in constellation Pisces area consists of :

See also
Chinese astronomy
Traditional Chinese star names
Chinese constellations

References

External links
Pisces – Chinese associations
香港太空館研究資源
中國星區、星官及星名英譯表
天象文學
台灣自然科學博物館天文教育資訊網
中國古天文
中國古代的星象系統

Astronomy in China
Pisces (constellation)